This is a list of all lighthouses in the U.S. state of Alaska as identified by the United States Coast Guard. There are eleven active lights in the state; the other five have been replaced by automated skeleton towers.

The history of Alaskan lighthouses predates the Seward purchase: the Russians erected a light at Sitka, in Baranof Castle (located on Castle Hill); this light was found unnecessary by the Lighthouse Service and discontinued, but was taken over by the army and maintained by them until 1877. The first American lighthouses in the state were erected in 1902 but most early lights were rebuilt before 1940 in a distinctive Art Deco style; the only surviving building from the earlier group is the Eldred Rock Light. The last constructed were replacements for the lights on Unimak Island in 1950.

Alaska has the northernmost and westernmost lighthouses in the United States, and some of the most isolated as well. Keepers at the Cape Sarichef and Scotch Cap Lights on Unimak Island in the Aleutians were not permitted to bring their families to the station, and served four years before getting an entire year of leave; Cape Sarichef received no supplies from August 1912 to June 1913, and both lights shut down in the winter due to sea ice. Scotch Cap was also the site of the worst lighthouse disaster in US history, when it was destroyed by a tsunami in the 1946 Aleutian Islands earthquake, killing all five coastguardmen stationed there.

If not otherwise noted, focal height and coordinates are taken from the United States Coast Guard Light List, while location and dates of activation, automation, and deactivation are taken from the United States Coast Guard Historical information site for lighthouses.

References

Lighthouses
Lighthouses
 
Lighthouses
Alaska